Alexander Mikhailovich Plisetski (20 October 1931 — 29 October 1985) was a Russian ballet master and choreographer and a younger brother of the famous Russian ballerina Maya Plisetskaya.

Biography

Family 
Alexander Plisetski was born on 20 October 1931 into the family of a diplomat and an actress, both of Lithuanian Jewish origin.

His father, Mikhail Plisetski (1899–1938), was Consul General of the USSR at the island of Spitsbergen, where he managed the coal concessions (trust "Arctic - carbon"). In 1938 he was purged, charged with espionage and executed. He was rehabilitated on 3 March 1956. 

His mother, Rachel Messerer (1902–1993, also known as Ra Messerer), was a silent film actress.  Shortly after her husband was arrested, she was sent to a labour camp in Kazakhstan named the “”.  During her imprisonment, Alexander stayed with the family of her brother, Asaf Messerer, while his elder sister, Maya Plisetskaya, who later became a famous ballerina, was placed in the custody of her sister Sulamith Messerer. 

In 1969 Alexander married a ballerina, Marianna Sedova. Their daughter, Anna Plisetskaya (born 1971), became a ballerina and actress.

Career 
 In 1949, graduated from the Moscow State Academy of Choreography.
 From 1949 to 1971 - a ballet soloist of the Bolshoi Theatre.
 From 1965 to 1968 - Professor in Moscow State Academy of Choreography.
 From 1968 to 1985 — Ballet master and  Artistic director of ballet in many cities (in particular, since 1972, worked by invitation as Ballet master in Kiev, Odessa, Ufa, Bashkortostan and Kazan, and, in 1973, with the Finnish National Opera).
 From 1974 to 1976 - founded the ballet in the Universidad Nacional Mayor de San Marcos in Lima.
 From 1976 to 1978  — Professor and choreographer with the Ballet company Teatro Colón in Buenos Aires.
 From 1979 to 1980  - Professor and choreographer with the Finnish National Opera, where he staged the ballet Carmen Suite.
 From 1981 to 1985 - Ballet master with the Tbilisi Opera and Ballet Theatre, where, together with the choreographers Michael Lavrovski (Ru) and George Aleksidze (Ru), staged Porgy and Bess and Romeo and Juliet.
 Obtained permission to stage the ballet Serenade for String Orchestra with choreography by George Balanchine.  This ballet was a great success on the stage in November 1984.

Performances 

In the period from 1973 to 1985, Alexander Plisetski staged several ballets, including:
 Carmen Suite to the music of Georges Bizet arranged by Shchedrin with choreography by Alberto Alonso
 «Grand Pas Classique» from the ballet Raymonda to music by Glazunov
 Walpurgis Night from the opera Faust by Gounod
 Dances from the opera Turandot and Two widows to the music of Smetana
 Porgy and Bess to the music of Gershwin with choreography by Michael Lavrovski
 Romeo and Juliet to music by Prokofiev
 Serenade to music by Tchaikovsky

Theatres which have hosted Plisetsi's productions include, The Odessa Opera and Ballet Theater, the National Opera of Ukraine, the Tbilisi Opera and Ballet Theatre, the Sydney Opera House, the Finnish National Opera, the Universidad Nacional Mayor de San Marcos and the Teatro Colón.

Death 
Plisetski was in need of heart surgery, which should have been carried out in the United States by invitation from Igor Youskevitch; however, due to his choreographic commitments, the operation was postponed. In the last year of his life he was actively involved in the staging of Serenade for Strings, which premiered in Moscow in November 1984.

Plisetski died on 29 October 1985 in Moscow during heart surgery.

Awards and honours 
Diploma of the Presidium of the Supreme Council

Reviews 
 "... The success of the ballet in Moscow at the Bolshoi Theater and the Central Concert Hall is big and obvious ... one-act ballet to the music of "Serenade for Strings" by Tchaikovsky, resume carefully and anxiously. Alexander Plisetski was able to obtain from the corps de ballet of artistic disciplines, which does not exclude the spirituality of dance ... The very fact of staging "Serenade" looks like a wonderful symbol: Balanchine if returned to his homeland in the hold of his best creations..."
 " ... ballet "Serenade" (choreographer - tutor Alexander Plisetski) pleased with freshness and harmony of plastic paint ..."

See also
 List of Russian ballet dancers

References

External links 
 Alexander Plisetski's Biography

Russian male ballet dancers
Ballet choreographers
Russian choreographers
Russian Jews
Ballet teachers
Plisetski–Messerer family
1931 births
1985 deaths